Honoré Anoumou Aguiar (born 27 January 1965) is a Togolese boxer. He competed in the 1988 Summer Olympics.

References

1965 births
Living people
Boxers at the 1988 Summer Olympics
Togolese male boxers
Olympic boxers of Togo
Light-welterweight boxers
21st-century Togolese people